Careca (born 1960) is a former Brazilian footballer who played as a striker.

Careca may also refer to:

 People
 Rodrigo Vergilio (born 1983), Brazilian footballer who plays as a striker
 Careca II, or Hamilton de Souza (born 1968), former Brazilian footballer who played as a striker
 Marcos Paulo Segobe da Silva (born 1980), Brazilian footballer who plays as a defensive midfielder
 Leomir Silva Teles (born 1989), Brazilian footballer who plays as a striker
 Careca Bianchezi (born 1964), former Brazilian footballer who played as a striker
 Mudather Careca (born 1988), Sudanese footballer who plays as a striker
 Márcio Careca (born 1978), Brazilian footballer who plays as a left-back
 Fernando Lopes Pereira (born 1989), Brazilian international futsal goalkeeper
 Careca (footballer, born 1995), Brazilian football attacking midfielder

 Places
 Morro do Careca, Brazilian large dune located in the city of Natal, Rio Grande do Norte state

 Others
 Careca, a Brazilian bread roll

See also
 Carecas do ABC, Brazilian skinhead group based in the ABC region, in the Greater São Paulo
 Carequinha (1915–2006), Brazilian clown